See also Thornley in Weardale.

Thornley is a village in County Durham, in England. It is situated about 5 miles (9 km) to the east of Durham and 5 miles (7 km) west of Peterlee. Thornley is part of the Sedgefield parliamentary constituency of which Tony Blair was the Member of Parliament from 1983 until 2007.

Governance
An electoral ward in the same name exists. This ward stretches south to Trimdon Foundry with a population taken at the 2011 Census of 7,085.

History of Thornley

Mining
As with most villages in the area, it grew rapidly with the development of coal-mining in the region. The first shaft was sunk in 1835 and the first coals were delivered via a new mineral railway line to Hartlepool shortly thereafter. The village thus played a major role in the development of Hartlepool as a port. Thornley miners played a key role in the formation of the Durham Miners' Association, the first meeting of which was held in the grounds of the village's Half-Way House public house in 1869. The colliery closed in 1970 with the loss of over 900 jobs and there is now little evidence to be seen of its once extensive plant and machinery.

Rebuilding
Easington Rural District Council's policy in the 1960s, 1970s and 1980s was to actively discourage development and employment in the ex-colliery villages of East Durham in favour of the new town of Peterlee. One of the oldest surviving buildings in the village, the Half-Way House was extensively refurbished and extended in the late 1970s and renamed The Crossways Hotel. The building was demolished in early 2008 and planning permission has been given for the building of housing on the site. Permission has also been given for the demolition of another old building, Gore Hall Farm, for the same purpose.

Only recently has new house building been sanctioned by the council in the so-called 'bottom end' of the village. In the meantime, two estates of 20th century council housing have recently been demolished due to the decline in the village's population since the closure of the colliery, Thornlaw North and Coopers Close. The latter was built as recently as 1968 at the expense of a children's recreation ground, several mature trees and many local garden allotments which were also not replaced. The demolition of the Thornlaw North estate has allowed the council to sell the land to a large housebuilding company, Persimmon plc, to build 'executive' housing. A small amount of affordable housing will be built. This project is now (December 2007) well advanced. The council believes that one consequence of the reduction in population is that existing services will be threatened. Plans for the Cooper's Close site have yet to be revealed.

St Bartholomew's Church in the heart of the village, which dates from 1843, was demolished in September 2007. Houses are to be built on the site and many gravestones in the churchyard have already been moved. However, its stained glass windows have been preserved and are currently held in storage for possible future display. The village once had two cinemas, The Hippodrome, built in 1912 and The Ritz, built in 1938: both have been demolished.

Lt John Scott Youll, a former electrician
at Thornley Colliery, was awarded the Victoria Cross during his service with the Northumberland Fusiliers in Italy in World War One. The village's war memorial had a special monument added to it in his honour in 2005.

Sport
A greyhound racing and whippet racing track known as the Thornley Greyhound Stadium and earlier the Halfway House running grounds (because of the Halfway House Inn situated next door) existed on the junction of Dunelem Road and the A181. The racing was independent (not affiliated to the sports governing body the National Greyhound Racing Club) and was known as a flapping track, which was the nickname given to independent tracks. The stadium was active in 1936 and was still in place in 1967 but had been demolished by 1976.

Gallery

References

External links

 http://www.wheatleyhill.com/Thornley/index.htm
 http://www.oldthornley.com
 http://www.dmm.org.uk/colliery/t002.htm
 https://web.archive.org/web/20070927005943/http://www.durham.gov.uk/miner/projects.nsf/581cd74a9c6aa8b080256d48003758cb/49810d53a07666df80256e8b003b1a4b?OpenDocument
 https://archive.today/20130505132238/http://www.thenorthernecho.co.uk/features/columnists/memories/durham/3945525.Ex_con_fights_his_way_to_colliery_fame/

Villages in County Durham